Ohinemuri may refer to the following in New Zealand:
 Ohinemuri (New Zealand electorate), former general electorate (1896–1928)
 Ohinemuri County, former county (1885–1989)
 Ohinemuri River, river with a source close to the mining town of Waihi